Mount Nubian is a sharp point of rock at the end of a ridge formed by a lava flow, situated 1 nautical mile (1.9 km) southeast of Mount Aurora on Black Island, in the Ross Archipelago. The rock forming the mountain is a glossy basalt and appears exceptionally black. Named by the New Zealand Geological Survey Antarctic Expedition (NZGSAE) (1958–59) after a tribe resident in Sudan, and in keeping with Black Island.

Mountains of the Ross Dependency
Black Island (Ross Archipelago)